Pseudorhaphitoma pyramis is a small sea snail, a marine gastropod mollusk in the family Mangeliidae.

Description
The length of the shell attains 12 mm.

The white shell is angularly longitudinally sharp ribbed, six-sided, with close revolving striae.

Distribution
This marine species occurs off Korea, the Philippines, Indonesia and Queensland, Australia

References

 Hinds, R.B. 1843. Description of new shells from the collection of Captain Belcher. Annals and Magazine of Natural History ser. 1 11: 16–21, 36–46, 255–257
 Reeve, L.A. 1846. Descriptions of new species of shells. Proceedings of the Zoological Society of London 1845: 108-119

External links
 
 

pyramis
Gastropods described in 1843